Diospyros chamaethamnus, called sand apple in English, is a plant which can be found in Namibia. It is a relative of persimmons and ebony and like these provides useful wood and edible fruit. It may also have medical properties and some other uses in managing malaria.

References 

chamaethamnus
Fruits originating in Africa
Flora of Namibia